is a former Japanese football player and manager. he is current assistant manager J1 League club of Kyoto Sanga.

Playing career
Sugiyama was born in Takatsuki on October 27, 1971. After graduating from Osaka University of Commerce, he joined Urawa Reds in 1994. He became a regular player as left side back from first season. However his opportunity to play decreased behind Shinji Jojo from 1997 and he could not play at all in the match in 1998. In 1999, he moved to Verdy Kawasaki (later Tokyo Verdy). He became a regular player in the club with many young players due to financial strain end of 1998 season. However his opportunity to play decreased from 2001. In 2003, he moved to J2 League club Albirex Niigata. However he could hardly play in the match and he retired end of 2003 season.

Coaching career
Sugiyama was the academy coach of Urawa Reds from 2004 until 2009, and head coach of Albirex Niigata Singapore from 2010 until 2013. During his time in Singapore, he won the S.League Coach Of The Year award in 2011, the same year he guided his team to win the Singapore League Cup and finalist of the Singapore Cup. In August 2014, he signed with Thai club Ayutthaya and managed the club until November. In 2015, he returned to Japan and became a coach at Kashiwa Reysol. In 2016, he moved to Thailand and signed with BBCU. He managed the club until April. In April 2016, he moved to Chainat Hornbill and managed the club until June. In 2017, he returned to Japan and signed with J3 League club Blaublitz Akita. The club won the champions in 2017 J3 League. However the club results were bad in 2018 season and he was sacked in July 2018. In 2019, he signed with Japan Football League club Nara Club.

Club statistics

Managerial statistics

Honours
Albirex Niigata Singapore

League Cup:
2011

Blaublitz Akita

J3 League:
2017

References

External links
 
 
 Champion in 2011
 Profile at Blaublitz Akita

1971 births
Living people
Osaka University of Commerce alumni
Association football people from Osaka Prefecture
People from Takatsuki, Osaka
Japanese footballers
J1 League players
J2 League players
Urawa Red Diamonds players
Tokyo Verdy players
Albirex Niigata players
Japanese football managers
Singapore Premier League head coaches
J3 League managers
Albirex Niigata Singapore FC managers
Blaublitz Akita managers
Nara Club managers
Association football defenders